Lenox "Lenny" Paul (born 25 May 1958) is a British bobsledder who competed from the mid-1980s to the mid-1990s. Competing in four Winter Olympics, he earned his best finish of fifth in the four-man event at Lillehammer in 1994. He also served in the British armed forces. He then mentored young people in Ipswich, Suffolk, England at Copleston High School.

References
 1988 bobsleigh four-man results
 1992 bobsleigh two-man results
 1992 bobsleigh four-man results
 1994 bobsleigh two-man results
 1994 bobsleigh four-man results
 1998 bobsleigh two-man results
 British Olympic Association profile

1958 births
Bobsledders at the 1988 Winter Olympics
Bobsledders at the 1992 Winter Olympics
Bobsledders at the 1994 Winter Olympics
Bobsledders at the 1998 Winter Olympics
British male bobsledders
Living people
Olympic bobsledders of Great Britain